The 50th General Assembly of Newfoundland and Labrador was elected at the 2021 Newfoundland and Labrador general election and sworn-in April 12, 2021.

Seating Plan

Current as of September 2022

List of members

References 

Terms of the General Assembly of Newfoundland and Labrador
General Assembly, 50
Newfoundland and Labrador General Assembly, 50